Brent Van Moer (born 12 January 1998) is a Belgian cyclist, who currently rides for UCI WorldTeam . In October 2020, he was named in the startlist for the 2020 Vuelta a España.

Career 
He won the first stage of the 2021 Critérium du Dauphiné with an impressive solo attack in which he held off the peloton. On stage 4 of 2021 Tour de France attacked as soon as 'the race is on' was declared ten kilometers into the stage. He and Pierre-Luc Périchon were the only two breakaway riders and the pair stayed away all day. He eventually went on a solo attack but he was caught in the final 150 meters by the peloton as Mark Cavendish went on to take stage. Van Moer was awarded the Most Combative Rider for his efforts.

Major results

2016
 1st  Overall Sint-Martinusprijs Kontich
1st Stage 3a
 3rd Overall Keizer der Juniores
 6th La Philippe Gilbert Juniors
 6th Omloop der Vlaamse Gewesten
 7th Paris–Roubaix Juniors
 9th E3 Harelbeke Junioren
2017
 2nd Time trial, National Under-23 Road Championships
2018
 2nd  Time trial, UCI Road World Under-23 Championships
 2nd Omloop Het Nieuwsblad Beloften
 2nd De Kustpijl
 6th Paris–Roubaix Espoirs
2019
 1st  Time trial, National Under-23 Road Championships
 3rd Sundvolden GP
 5th Time trial, UCI Road World Under-23 Championships
 7th Overall Le Triptyque des Monts et Châteaux
1st Stage 2a (ITT)
 7th Overall Danmark Rundt
2021
 1st Stage 1 Critérium du Dauphiné
  Combativity award Stage 4 Tour de France
2023
 3rd Grand Prix La Marseillaise

Grand Tour general classification results timeline

References

External links

1998 births
Living people
Belgian male cyclists
People from Beveren
Cyclists from East Flanders